In mechanism design, a branch of economics, a weakly-budget-balanced (WBB) mechanism is a mechanism in which the total payment made by the participants is 0. This means that the mechanism operator does not incur a deficit, i.e., does not have to subsidize the market. Weak budget balance is considered a necessary requirement for the economic feasibility of a mechanism. A strongly-budget-balanced (SBB) mechanism is a mechanism in which the total payment made by the participants is exactly 0. This means that all payments are made among the participants - the mechanism has neither a deficit nor a surplus. The term budget-balanced mechanism is sometimes used as a shorthand for WBB, and sometimes as a shorthand for SBB.

Weak budget balance 
A simple example of a WBB mechanism is the Vickrey auction, in which the operator wants to sell an object to one of n potential buyers. Each potential buyer bids a value, the highest bidder wins an object and pays the second-highest bid. As all bids are positive, the total payment is trivially positive too.

As an example of a non-WBB mechanism, consider its extension to a bilateral trade setting. Here, there is a buyer and a seller; the buyer has a value of b and the seller has a cost of s. Trade should occur if and only if b > s. The only truthful mechanism that implements this solution must charge a trading buyer the cost s and pay a trading seller the value b; but since b > s, this mechanism runs a deficit. In fact, the Myerson–Satterthwaite theorem says that every Pareto-efficient truthful mechanism must incur a deficit.

McAfee developed a solution to this problem for a large market (with many potential buyers and sellers): McAfee's mechanism is WBB, truthful and almost Pareto-efficient - it performs all efficient deals except at most one. McAfee's mechanism has been extended to various settings, while keeping its WBB property. See double auction for more details.

Strong budget balance 
In a strongly-budget-balanced (SBB) mechanism, all payments are made between the participants themselves. An advantage of SBB is that all the gain from trade remains in the market; thus, the long-term welfare of the traders is larger and their tendency to participate may be higher. 

McAfee's double-auction mechanism is WBB but not SBB - it may have a surplus, and this surplus may account for almost all the gain from trade. There is a simple SBB mechanism for bilateral trading: trade occurs iff b > s, and in this case the buyer pays (b+s)/2 to the seller. Since the payment goes directly from the buyer to the seller, the mechanism is SBB; however, it is not truthful, since the buyer can gain by bidding b' < b and the seller can gain by bidding s''' > s''.  Recently, some truthful SBB mechanisms for double auction have been developed. Some of them have been generalized to multi-sided markets.

See also 

 Balanced budget - a budget in which revenues are equal to expenditures
 Government budget balance - a financial statement presenting the government's proposed revenues and spending for a financial year.
 Balanced budget amendment - a rule in the USA constitution requiring that a state cannot spend more than its income.

References 

Mechanism design
Auction theory